Borislav Gabrovski (30 January 1910 – 14 August 1977) was a Bulgarian footballer. He played in 30 matches for the Bulgaria national football team from 1929 to 1938. He was also part of Bulgaria's team for their qualification matches for the 1938 FIFA World Cup.

References

External links
 

1910 births
1977 deaths
Bulgarian footballers
Bulgaria international footballers
Place of birth missing
Association footballers not categorized by position